Bhumikasthan Municipality is a municipality located within the Arghakhanchi District of the Lumbini Province of Nepal. The municipality spans , with a total population of 32,640 according to a 2011 Nepal census.

On March 10, 2017, the Government of Nepal restructured the local level bodies into 744 (later increased to 753) new local level structures. The previous Dhatiwang, Dharapani, Asurkot, Khilji, Nuwakot, Dhikura and Dhanchaur VDCs were merged to form Bhumikasthan. Bhumikasthan is divided into 10 wards, with Nuwakot declared the administrative center of the municipality.

References 

Municipalities in Lumbini Province
Nepal municipalities established in 2017